Kid Colt is the name of two fictional characters appearing in American comic books published by Marvel Comics. The first is a cowboy whose adventures have taken place in numerous western-themed comic book series published by Marvel. The second is a cowboy-themed horse-like superhero. The character's first appearance was in Kid Colt #1 (August 1948).

Publication history

Kid Colt starred in the comic book series Kid Colt Outlaw, as well as in several other titles. He is the longest-running cowboy star in American comic-book publishing, featured in stories for a 31-year stretch from 1948 to 1979, though from 1966 most of the published stories were reprints.

Kid Colt appeared in numerous series through that decade, including All Western Winners, Wild Western, Two-Gun Western, and Gunsmoke Western. Each issue of The Mighty Marvel Western featured three Old West heroes: the Rawhide Kid and the Two-Gun Kid in all issues, and Kid Colt in all issues except #25-42 (July 1973 - Oct. 1975), in which Matt Slade, from the 1956 series Matt Slade, Gunfighter, published by Marvel forerunner Atlas Comics, was substituted. Virtually all Kid Colt stories were drawn by the character's longtime artist, Jack Keller. The series ended with #229 (April 1979), making it the longest-running Western comic book.

Kid Colt additionally headlined the three-issue Giant-Size Kid Colt (Jan. 1975-July 1975), which consisted entirely of reprints except for one new story in each of the latter two issues.

The character has appeared sporadically in Marvel universe superhero titles, usually in stories involving time travel between the current era and Western times. These have included The Avengers #141-43 (1975), The Fantastic Four vol. 3 #33-34 (2000) and The Black Panther vol. 3 #46-47 (2002).

It was not until 2000, with the miniseries Blaze of Glory, by writer John Ostrander and artist Leonardo Manco, that a Western series again featured Kid Colt. The gritty miniseries — which featured different-looking versions of Marvel Western characters and retconned that the naively clean-cut Marvel Western stories of years past were merely dime novel fictions of their actual lives — killed off Kid Colt in the series' conclusion (#4, March 2000). An older version of Kid Colt appears in 'Skaar: King Of The Savage Land, having faked his death and subsequently time-traveling.

Marvel reintroduced Kid Colt as teenager in a 2009 "one-shot" comic ("Kill the Kid") written by Tom Defalco and illustrated by Rick Burchett (originally published in digital format). The book, narrated by a self-proclaimed drifter named Everett Hawkmore who partners with the Kid, retells a somewhat modified origin story.

The character also appears in 2010's Rawhide Kid: The Sensational Seven.

Fictional character biography
Kid Colt (Western hero)

Kid Colt (real name: Blaine Colt, but see below) is an American Old West cowboy who was wrongly accused of murder (he killed his father's murderer in a fair gun battle) and became a fugitive from the law, along the way engaging in heroic good acts in an effort to restore his reputation.

Kid Colt was later killed.

Kid Colt was later reintroduced as a teenager whose real name was changed to Blaine Cole. A brother of Cole was missing after the raid that killed his parents and a search for a witness to the gunfight that had erroneously branded him an outlaw.

An older version of Kid Colt later appears, having faked his death and subsequently time-traveling.

During a period where time itself was becoming unraveled, Kid Colt teamed up with the Hulk, Rawhide Kid and Two-Gun Kid to stop a murderous sheriff with time-traveling powers.

Kid Colt (superhero)

Kid Colt (real name: Elric Freedom Whitemane) is a contemporary superhero character in the Marvel Comics universe who has appeared as a member of the modern-day Young Allies. Created by Fabian Nicieza and Mark Bagley, he debuted in Heroes Reborn: Young Allies #1 (Jan. 2000).

Born to hippies, Elric was a normal child, until government agents paid his parents to let them give him special "tests" (which were attempts to fuse his DNA with the DNA of the equine aliens known as the Kymellians). The tests were successful, and young Elric changed into a strange, bipedal horse-like creature. Hearing stories of the wild west, Elric assumed the identity of Kid Colt, and began to use his newfound powers to help those in need. He was eventually recruited by the Young Allies to help them free two alien beings. Elric decided to remain with the team.

Elric is a hybrid of human and Kymellian. Due to his alien DNA, he can shapeshift into a humanoid horse, and teleport short distances. He can store items in sub-space "closets", pockets of extra-dimensional space which can hold items as large as a human being until Elric needs them. By creating multiple pockets which are linked together, Elric can run through them, and seem to rapidly blink in-and-out of existence. When he is not in his horse form, Elric wears a cowboy-themed costume in homage to the original Kid Colt. Due to his horse-like digestive system, Elric is a vegetarian.

In other media
Television
 In the Agent Carter episode "Better Angels", Peggy Carter and Howard Stark are seen on the set of a film based on Kid Colt which Stark's movie studio is producing. Stark also briefly mentions that Kid Colt was an actual historical figure.

Video games
 Kid Colt appears in Lego Marvel Super Heroes 2'', where he and Arizona Annie help Star-Lord rescue Rocket Raccoon and Groot from a circus train run by the local version of the Circus of Crime.

References

External links
 
 
 Kid Colt at Don Markstein's Toonopedia. Archived from the original on November 17, 2015.
 The Marvel Chronology Project
 International Catalogue of Superheroes: Kid Colt
 Jack Keller Remembered

1948 comics debuts
1979 comics endings
2000 comics debuts
Atlas Comics characters
Characters created by Fabian Nicieza
Characters created by Mark Bagley
Characters created by Stan Lee
Comics characters introduced in 1948
Comics characters introduced in 2000
Fictional cowboys and cowgirls
Fictional extraterrestrial–human hybrids in comics
Fictional horses
Golden Age adventure heroes
Marvel Comics characters who are shapeshifters
Marvel Comics extraterrestrial superheroes
Marvel Comics hybrids
Marvel Comics male superheroes
Marvel Comics superheroes
Marvel Comics Western (genre) characters
Timely Comics characters
Western (genre) gunfighters